Heliozona lianga is a moth of the family Erebidae first described by Georg Semper in 1899. It is found on Mindanao in the Philippines.

References

Moths described in 1899
Spilosomina